The Journal of Indian Society of Periodontology is a peer-reviewed open access medical journal published by Medknow Publications on behalf of the Indian Society of Periodontology. It covers all aspects of periodontology.

Abstracting and indexing 
The journal is abstracted and indexed in:

External links 
 

Open access journals
Quarterly journals
English-language journals
Dentistry journals
Medknow Publications academic journals
Publications established in 1997
Academic journals associated with learned and professional societies of India